Fiestas patronales in Puerto Rico are yearly celebrations held in each municipality of the island. Like in other countries, "fiestas patronales" are heavily influenced by Spanish culture and religion, and are dedicated to a saint or virgin.

The festivities usually include religious processions honoring its Catholic heritage. However, elements of African and local culture have been incorporated as well. They also feature parades, games, artisans, amusement rides, regional food, and live entertainment.

Schedule of fiestas patronales

See also

 Fiestas patronales de Ponce
 Patronal festival

References

External links
Fiestas Patronales on SalonHogar